17-Phenylandrostenol (17-PA), or (3α,5α)-17-phenylandrost-16-en-3-ol, is a steroid drug which binds to GABAA receptors. It acts as an antagonist against the sedative effects of neuroactive steroids, but has little effect when administered by itself, and does not block the effects of benzodiazepines or barbiturates.

Chemistry

See also
 Androstenol

References

Androstanes
GABAA receptor negative allosteric modulators
Neurosteroids